is a Japanese anime television series created by Kia Asamiya. The anime series was produced by Nippon Animation and broadcast on NHK Educational TV from 1999 to 2000. It was licensed for North American release by Viz Media. This series has aired on Cartoon Network outside the United States. In the US, the San Jose market licensed KTEH aired the series in its English-subtitled version as part of its Sunday Late-Prime (9pm-after 12) Sci-Fi programming line-up in the 90s.

Two manga series were also released: a two volume series by Asamiya and published in Ciao from 1999 to 2000; and a nine volume two-part series by Keiko Okamoto which was published by NHK Publishing. The second manga series was licensed in North America and translated into English by Tokyopop beginning in 2002.

It was created based on the Japanese novels "Nanso Satomi Hakkenden".  This series follows a basic Magical girl progression, but Corrector Yui's magic powers all derive from incorporated entirely into her digital avatar as antivirus software for the virtual world, with no real powers granted outside of network.

Plot
It is the year 20** and computers become an integral part of society, Internet had evolved into a virtual reality called "ComNet". However, a teenage girl Yui Kasuga is one of the few who cannot use computers at all, despite the fact that her father is a software developer. At the time, an evil host computer called Grosser wants to take over the both of ComNet and real world. The eight softwares whose developed to correct Grosser's evil intention, they're digital avatars exist only on ComNet and need help of a human called Corrector. Yui is sucked into the ComNet where she is recruited by I.R., one of eight softwares who gives her element suits that allow her to ComNet Fairy "Corrector Yui" and fight Grosser's evil softwares.

In the first season, the series revolves around the war against Grosser, and reveals the mysteries that surround the Correctors, their seemingly missing Grosser and Correctors's creator, and the relationship that he seems to have had with the corrupted softwares.

In the second season, Yui and the Correctors must fight with a mysterious computer virus who menaces the ComNet, and also cope with the mysterious Corrector Ai, a Corrector who tends to work on her own and seems to have her own agenda. The key to the mysteries seems to be a strange young girl who seems lost and may be related with the devastating virus appearances.

Characters

Main 
 / 

A 14-year-old girl of dubious academic skill, has aspirations to become a manga artist and/or voice actress. Yui has shown skill and growth over the series as she assumes the secret on-line identity of "Corrector Yui". While utterly incompetent when physically interfacing with computers, in ComNet has the abilities to correct computer virus or software bug and a tremendously powerful fighter as Corrector, able to quickly undo damage and easily battle the strongest of Grosser's henchmen. Her optimistic view and her ability to cheer up others even at the worst moment (though sometimes she can be quite perky) was one of her greatest strengths, making her easily likeable by her peers a fellow Corrector programs. She also has an empathetic personality that helps her understand the nature of AI programs she meets on the ComNet. In 1st season, it was revealed that her singing voice had ability to normalize programs. In 2nd season, she upgrade to Advanced Elemental Suit. In finale, she upgraded to Final Element Suit.
 /  / 

Yui's best friend. She has a polite, calm, and caring personality. Her intelligence and innate ability with computers, and her voice that enable to normalize programs had makes her a perfect candidate for Corrector, as expected by Professor Inukai. From the beginning she was supposed to be a Corrector, but I.R. confused her with Yui, thanks to Grosser's intervention. When Professor Inukai was passing Corrector tasks and abilities to her, she got manipulated by Grosser, who turned her into Dark Angel Haruna, but she was eventually saved by Yui. In the 2nd season, she again returns as a Corrector to assist Yui, first when Yui got petrified by infected insects, and later, when she helps Yui until the end of the 2nd season. Curiously, she can use Element Suits more effectively than Yui. Her Basic Elemental Suit reminds of angel.
 / 

Shun's cousin. A dark and mysterious girl who becomes a Corrector on her own in the second season. Her bitter experience in the past seems to be the reason for her cold, apathic demeanor as a mask to protect herself. While at most times she does her job by mostly cold, no-nonsense efficiency, Yui's action sometimes force her to reconsider and help Yui. She became a Corrector to search for the "little girl", believing that she might be connected with her mother's coma. While at first she rather despised Yui, and considered her little more than a nuisance, in the end she admires her optimistic view of life, and her ability to cheer up others. Her Basic Element Suit is reminiscent of the maid.

Professor Inukai is the creator of Correctors and Grosser. He attempts to stop Grosser by sending Correctors, but he is left comatose after Grosser intercepts him. His mind, incomplete and amnesiac, wanders the Net, seeing help and evading Grosser's henchmen. He eventually recovers and passes on his Corrector abilities to Yui. He helps her repair and build Element Suits, and provides a base of operations for the Correctors.

Family

Ai's cousin. An engineering/medical student, also Yui's love interest (which he is unaware of). Very skillful with computers and the ComNet, he is often helping Yui (albeit indirectly) in her task as Corrector. Later in the end of season one, he was abducted by Grosser, as bait to lure Yui and the other Correctors to battle him in his lair. In the second season, he's gone to U.S. for study and doesn't appear the show.

Yui's father. He is a computer programmer, also the head of project team that developed virtual amusement parks called Galaxy Land and Marine Adventure Net. He loves Yui very much, and is always distressed when he sees Yui with some guy (especially Shun).

Yui's mother. An excellent cook, whose work is highly favored by Yui and her father.

Ai's mother. A motherly figure whom Ai loves very much. Now she's comatose, thanks to an accident that severed the connection between her mind and body. Her mind is imprisoned by Ryo Kurokawa after she attempts to release the "missing little girl", thus causing an accident that kills Ryo and releases the girl into the ComNet. By the final episode, her consciousness is freed from ComNet and Azusa wakes up from her coma.

Ai's father. Deceased 10 years ago. He and Ai's mother originally belonged to the science team that created the ComNet. His death triggered Ai's attempt to mask her heart, at first to make her mother less worried.

Classmates and teachers

 Yui's childhood friend. He also Haruna's boyfriend. His demeanor contrasts with Haruna, often making him a joke target by Yui and her peers, though he is a nice boy at heart.

Yui's best friend.

Yui's best friend.

Yui's friend.

Yui's friend.

Yui's teacher. Though she's actually a good, supportive teacher, her childish personality can sometimes create trouble.

Correctors
Eight softwares have close relationship with Yui throughout the show (Except for I.R. have same appearance as humans). Originally one software called the Corrector, but broken down into eight softwares under Grosser's attack. As such, each piece of software concentrates on a specific task, and Yui must learn to integrate their skillsets to defeat Grosser's minions, and eventually, Grosser himself. In finale of the 1st season, it's revealed that way they correct Grosser is their self-sacrifice. In 2nd season, Correctors and Yui deal with unknown computer viruses.

Corrector Software No. 1, The Regulator. Yui meets him in a space adventure site (not unlike an MMORPG). He has the ability to practically stop time for a limited time, enabling him to move at light-speed velocity. His power in the Wind Element Suit makes Yui able to stop time for about 15 seconds, and if other Correctors (such as I.R.) borrow its power, the time can be strengthened to 30 seconds. He has a "hero-guy" type personality and insists on being the team leader and great hero (treats Yui like a damsel in distress, said he didn't need a woman's help, always tries to go first without everyone's concern, tries to steal the spotlight every time, has some narcissistic streak, etc), which at first makes Yui tend to dislike him, and sometimes puts him at odds with the other Correctors, though he is actually a nice. He is mainly a comic relief for the show (especially 2nd season).

Corrector Software No. 2, The Synchronizer. Not much is known about this Corrector, since he was lost at the beginning of the series. At the end of the first season it is revealed that he was corrupted and became the Corruptor program War Wolf. His ability is similar to Wolf (using fire bursts as weapons), and one of the Correctors that has excellent fighting abilities on his own. His power of fire can be bestowed to other Correctors, to let them access the Fire Element Suit. He has a loyal personality, seems to have some feelings for Yui (refused Professor Inukai's orders to run from Grosser and goes save Inukai, or is the one that opposes Inukai's decision to transfer Corrector power from Yui to Haruna, refuses to become Haruna's ally and confesses in front of Inukai he want to follow Yui until the end). Beagle infections force him to stay in War Wolf form for most of the 2nd season, reminding him of his bad deeds in the past, causing him to become rather explosive, and Yui's attitude doesn't help either (she always call him "Doggy" out of habit, which annoys him). In the finale, He's back to true form and hugged with Yui who blushed.

Corrector Software No. 3, The Predictor. Yui meets her on a love fortune-telling site. Has ability to foresee the future. Her visions, though most of time accurate, can sometimes deviate, especially when she doesn't have enough data/knowledge about the subject (like when Yui hugged her, when her vision in which Yui shakes her hand, when they first meet, and when she is trapped in Rapunzel's tower on the fairytale simulation). Has wise, maternal personality. Her power enables Yui to access the Wind Element Suit and enables Yui to predict the enemies' movements and attacks. She often becomes a subject for Control's flirting, but thanks to her ability, she can evade most of it (leaving Control in distress).

Corrector Software No. 4, The System Maintainer. Yui meets him on a rainforest like simulation. He has the ability to control nature, like water and plants. His power helps Yui to access the Water Element Suit, and she can control nature at will, using it as defensive, recovering, or offensive tools. He has a rebellious, childish personality, and dislikes anyone who desecrates nature, to the point of kidnapping everyone who litters on the rainforest simulation. When Yui meets him, he at first hates Professor Inukai, whom he believed had left him, but he finally learns that Dr. Inukai actually loves him, just like the other Correctors, and left him there for his own safety.

Corrector Software No. 5, The Repairer. She has the ability to heal damage, including Element Suit damage, and when she lends her power to Yui, Yui can perform a barrier in the Water Element Suit that can knock back attacks. She has a sweet, rather naive (to the point of perky), and polite personality. While she is not prone to fighting, her fighting style includes applying non-lethal force as much as possible (like using a "tickler machine" and bug spray), and also using a vast array of traps and gadgets (she is notoriously known among the other Correctors for this, she even dubbed herself the "Trap Princess"). All her antics and naivety especially disturbs Freeze (whom Rescue seems interested in). In the 2nd season, she fights using bandages from her halo, anti-Beagles spray, and can also detect virus sources by using a radar on her halo.

Corrector Software No. 6, The Archiver. A pacifist old man who claims himself to be a "Peace Defender", who ironically has a knack for building destructive weapons. At first he disliked Yui for destroying the solitude he gained at the remote area he inhabited, but later he helped her drive away Grosser's Corruptors by lending her his power. His power enables Yui to access the Fire Element Suit, with the "Flame Bomber" projectile attack. A wise person, he always speaks what he feels is right, even if it makes conflict with the other Correctors. In the 2nd season, from his data, the villain cloned him to wreak havoc on the ComNet, giving the distraction they needed to carry out their plan.

Corrector Software No. 7, The Compiler. Yui first met him, along with Peace, at a secluded area, separated from the main domain of the marine adventure simulation created by her father's company. A fat guy with a playful, sweet, almost childish demeanor. He likes Yui at first sight, because "she is cute". He has the ability to mimic practically anyone, and copy some abilities from the one he is mimicking. He is also the one with the biggest memory power out of all of the Correctors, and when he lends his power to Yui, Yui's power (and also her weight) in her Basic Element Suit changes greatly, and can also activate her Earth Element Suit. He's Peace's good friend. His ability to mimic others can sometimes be quite a nuisance for others, like when he teases Freeze by mimicking Rescue.

Corrector Software No. 8, The Installer. The first Corrector Software Yui meets, also Yui's best friend; I.R. always nags Yui about her duty as Corrector, sometimes making Yui annoyed to the end. He has a tendency to end his sentences with "Thank you", sometimes referred to as a Japanese raccoon dog, but hates that idea. He made the Basic Element Suit for Yui from a magic girls outfit stored at Galaxy Land, went download it to Yui until Season 2. he can also access the Earth Element Suit, giving Yui a large physical power boost, making her on par with Jaggy.

Villains/Corruptors

Leader of the Corruptors. At first, he is a "good" A.I. program created by Professor Inukai to manages the all over ComNet. However awareness of own ego and revolted against Professor Inukai. His contact with Yui; a girl who cried to computer thrown in the garbage made him want to "live", and later, to tried create the world where he could "live". Professor Inukai thinks it's fatal error and create the Correctors softwares to delete his mind. When Inukai chooses Haruna as Corrector, Grosser, who was fascinated with Yui from the beginning, manipulated I.R. and set Professor Inukai in accident, so that Yui would be the Corrector instead of Haruna. He even went as far as to turn Haruna into Dark Angel Haruna. In the 1st season finale, he pretended to be defeated by Yui and Correctors but possesses Shun's body, he confesses that he want to be Yui whom his dearest human and tried to convince Yui to let him her body, Yui could see through the disguise, and instead, she convinces him that he actually is a living being himself, capable of feeling happiness, pain, and sadness, and also Correctors and Corruptors who are softwares over the net. She also stated that for the sake of others who love her, she can't just quit to become herself, though sometimes she is bitter and sad. Grosser, who finally sees the error of his ways, deletes himself along with the whole ComNet, sparing a pretty much-devastated Yui. But at last, with moral support from Haruna, she could use her power and reinitialize the whole ComNet again. Grosser decided to start his life over and resurrects Correctors, Corruptors and Shun, all along were grateful to her.

Resembles a werewolf, he is Grosser's most loyal henchmen that prefers actual combat. He fights by using a lazer sword, and he has the ability to fire flames. He have a rivalry with Yui but she called him "Doggy", much to his annoyance. He is a master swordsman and has a somewhat honorable demeanor. He is, in fact, the lost corrector program Synchro, but this is unknown to him until near the end of the first season. Beagle infections in the beginning of the 2nd season have forced Synchro to stay in this form for the rest of the season.

The only female Software on Grosser's team. She is probably the most ruthless and competent of all of Grosser's henchmen, at least until the too-naive-to-be-true Rescue appears. She has the ability to freeze anything. In fact, Freeze, Jaggie, and Virus are Grosser's clones but which them didn't realizes. In the second season, after failing in many side-jobs, she finally accepts a job from a mysterious man to search for a young girl, who is "always present everywhere she's near". Later it was revealed that she has the innate ability to detect a virus presence (which she didn't realize), and later was used by this mysterious man to search for the "missing little girl". It is noted that she got a big personality change in the 2nd season, from the cold, no-nonsense villain in the 1st season into a ditzy, much more cheerful and girly attitude in the 2nd season. In the series finale, she joined to Correctors and even got her own Corrector suit (dubbed "Corrector Freeze" by some fans).

Despite his bulk size and his strength, Jaggy is (arguably) the most knowledgeable (though not the most talented) of all Grosser's henchmen. Most of his tactics including manipulating the environment to do his bidding (though most of it didn't do so well). Loves to read books. In the 2nd season, he became the library administrator, and seems to have some feelings for Freeze.

Armed with primarily a lazer sword and computer viruses called viruses command, he (arguably) has the most intelligence compared to his other teammates. He isn't prone to actual combat, and prefers to use more scheming methods. His computer viruses can be used to corrupt other programs and make them do his bidding. In the 2nd season, he works as a virus computer researcher, whom with Yui and Haruna's help finally identifies the source of Beagles Virus.

Others

A baby whale's software from the Marine Adventure Net area in ComNet. He was developed by Shinichi and his team based on actual whale calls. He doesn't like his original name, so he has given himself his own name. Grosser sees his singing voice as a threat, at finale of 1st season it's revealed that his voice evoking Grosser's sadness.

A software for spy specialist, worked with Grosser for while, but he went missing. At first, Yui and her friends thought he was Syncro. He contacts Yui and her friends while hides his nature and want to know who Yui is.

This red-haired young girl, with her teddy bear, is always present when the Beagle Virus appears. While she seems innocent and bears no harm, when emotionally pressured, and she sheds tears, her tears become the core for the Beagles virus. She is always searching for "sunflowers". Her picture was found within a storybook that belongs to Ai Shinozaki. Originally, she was created by Shintaro Ishikawa as a messenger software for his daughter. Ryo took her, experimenting on her with many computer viruses (not unlike Lisa Trevor), and thus the Beagles Virus was created with her as the host. Her name is "Ai", same with Shinozaki Ai. This girl can feel the emotions of others, which causes Ai to always lose her track, due to her heart's closure to others (which at first, she blamed on the ComCon, using logical deduction).

Missing Little Girl carries this teddy bear as her protector and backup. He is the one who stole Yui's newest ComCon and gave it to Ai instead. 

Voiced by: Mitsuru Ogata
This mysterious man is working in the fairytale simulation, as a performer for a "Sun, Wind and Traveler" story drama, as the traveler. He asks Freeze to search for the "missing little girl", claiming he wanted to return her home, with one condition; that she shouldn't talk about it with anyone. Behind his friendly demeanor, he was not beneath using cruel and dirty tactics to ensure his job was done (like cloning Peace at one point, or using a modified version of Beagle Virus). He promised a large sum of reward money for Freeze, stopping her from asking too much about the job. In the end, it is revealed he is just a mere pawn, controlled by another mastermind. At the end of the series, he helps Freeze to release the "missing little girl", and distracts Ryo, giving the Correctors a chance to reinitialize her.

He has dubbed himself as "the most despised man by ComNet and Shintaro Shinozaki". He is the true mastermind behind the Beagles Virus creation, whom he planned to use to destroy ComNet, and to form a new ComNet. He saw A.I. programs as tools, thus making him at odds with Inukai and Shinozaki, causing him to retire from the group. When Azusa Shinozaki attempted to release "Ai", he was killed by an accident that happened in his place, but his mind was keep intact in ComNet, interacting with the Beagles Virus. He didn't realize it until Prof. Inukai showed him the truth. In the end, Yui's finally able to reinitialize him in her Final Element Suit, and his final words were "At least... I can leave my hatred to humanity".

Miscellaneous

This bracelet is used by every Corrector as access, communication, transformation, radar, transmitter and receiver device. Even without VR units, every Corrector can enter ComNet easily with this. While entering ComNet, for people outside they would be seen as sleeping, so others wouldn't notice. Correctors softwares also possesses own ComCon, which allows they uses to abilities.

This virtual world is the form of Internet in Yui's world. Everyone can access and experience worlds inside it, using VR units. These is where the Softwares, digital avatars powered by AI are working. ComNet is connected to infrastructure, public services, or even entertiment around the world. Time goes 256 times faster in ComNet than in the real world (means, one second in the real world is approximately the same as 256 seconds (4 minutes, 16 seconds) in ComNet). However, being too long in ComNet can cause problems, because of fatigued body, causing symptoms which are dubbed as "ComNet Fever". That's why in regular VR units, there are failsafe programs that eject people automatically after 10 hours a day in ComNet. ComCon bracelets didn't have this feature, once causing Ai to get "ComNet Fever" when she stayed too long in the Net.

Originally, an outfit for online avator that I.R. upgraded to the physical strength and agility. By downloads own Basic Element Suit, Yui (and Haruna, Ai) can hides own identitiles, and to made others believed herselfs are softwares. In 2nd season, Professor Inukai adopted it for Corrector's uniform and instaled to Yui's ComCon. Besides, by installing a Correctors software's power, Yui (and Haruna, Ai) can transform into Element Suits of Wind, Fire, Water, and Earth. In the time install more than one power, still be in Basic Element Suit, gain pounds and lost agility for increased in amount of avatar's data.

Program similar to the magic; Yui, Haruna, Ai uses to corrects troubles in ComNet. Send out the stars from their magic wand to makes software bugs or computer virses fixing. Against Corrupters Software, can't initialize them unless gather a lot of powers but possible to damage them.

Appears in 2nd season; an unknown powerful computer virus. In the Japanese version, it's a coined word that is a mixture of "bug" and "virus".

Media

Manga
There are two versions of the Corrector Yui manga series. The original one was written and drawn by Kia Asamiya and published by Shogakkukan in Japan and does not have a release date in the States yet. It is a two volume series and was published in Ciao from 1999 to 2000.

The manga that Tokyopop published was done by shojo artist Keiko Okamoto and is a manga adaptation of the anime series. That one is a nine volume two-part series which was published by NHK Publishing. This manga series was licensed in North America and translated into English by Tokyopop beginning in 2002.

Anime
Viz Media has only released 18 of the 52 episodes onto Region 1 DVD in the United States. Whether or not Viz will release the rest of the series remains to be seen. The last DVD Viz released for the show, the 4th volume, came out 24 February 2004. It is one of the Viz Media-licensed anime shows with its manga or light novel counterpart not also licensed by Viz Media.

Theme Songs
Opening Theme

Episodes 1–26: "Eien to Iu Basho"

Lyrics: Anri / Composer: Masayoshi Yamazaki / Arrangement: COIL / Vocals: Anri with Masayoshi Yamazaki and Shikao Suga

Episodes 27–52: "Tori ni Naru Toki"

Lyrics, Composer and Vocals: Satsuki / Arrangement: Yasuhiro Kobayashi

Ending Theme

Episodes 1–26: "Mirai"

Lyrics: MILAI / Composer: Kazuhisa Yamaguchi / Arrangement: Kazuhisa Yamaguchi, LEGOLGEL / Vocals: LEGOLGEL

Episodes 27–52: "Requiem"

Lyrics, Composer and Vocals: Satsuki / Arrangement: Yasuhiro Kobayashi

List of episodes
1st Season

2nd Season

References

External links
 
 

1999 anime television series debuts
1999 manga
Anime with original screenplays
Kia Asamiya
Magical girl anime and manga
Nippon Animation
2000 Japanese television series endings
Pierrot (company)
Shogakukan manga
Tokyopop titles
NHK original programming
Viz Media anime
Television series set in the future